Heinrich Strobel may refer to:
Heinrich Strobel (musicologist) (1898-1970), German musicologist
Heinrich Ströbel (1869-1944), German journalist